Camphora is a genus of evergreen plants belonging to the laurel family, Lauraceae. The genus contains approximately 20 species, distributed in tropical and subtropical regions of Asia. This genus was previously considered a synonym of Cinnamomum.

Description
Species of Camphora are evergreen trees or shrubs. Their leaves are alternate and pinnately veined or weakly tripliveined, which differed from the opposite or subopposite and tripliveined leaves of Cinnamomum species. The tepals do not persistent when fruiting, while Cinnamomum species' persistent or at least partially persistent. Species have paniculate inflorescences with cymes bearing strictly opposite lateral flowers. Flowers are bisexual with nine fertile stamens, plus three staminodes with conspicuous cordate or sagittate heads in the fourth androecial whorl. The fruits are cupulate.

Taxonomy and phylogeny
The genus Camphora was introduced in 1759 by the German botanist Philipp Conrad Fabricius. It was listed under synonymy for Cinnamomum s.l. for a long time. And species were classified in the Sect. Camphora of  Cinnamomum. A molecular phylogenetic study published in 2022 found that the large genus Cinnamomum was polyphyletic. In the revised classification to create monophyletic genera, the following 18 species are placed in the resurrected genus Camphora:

Camphora bodinieri ≡ Cinnamomum bodinieri
Camphora brachythyrsa ≡ Cinnamomum brachythyrsum
Camphora chartophylla ≡ Cinnamomum chartophyllum
Camphora foveolata ≡ Cinnamomum foveolatum
Camphora glandulifera ≡ Cinnamomum glanduliferum
Camphora illicioides ≡ Cinnamomum ilicioides
Camphora longepaniculata ≡ Cinnamomum longepaniculatum
Camphora micrantha ≡ Cinnamomum micranthum
Camphora migao ≡ Cinnamomum migao
Camphora mollifolia ≡ Cinnamomum mollifolium
Camphora officinarum ≡ Cinnamomum camphora – camphor laurel
Camphora parthenoxylon ≡ Cinnamomum parthenoxylon – Selasian wood, Martaban camphor wood, saffrol laurel
Camphora philippinensis ≡ Cinnamomum philippinense
Camphora platyphylla ≡ Cinnamomum platyphyllum
Camphora purpurea ≡ Cinnamomum purpureum
Camphora rufotomentosa ≡ Cinnamomum rufomentosum
Camphora septentrionalis ≡ Cinnamomum septentrionale
Camphora tenuipilis ≡ Cinnamomum tenuipile

The following species are classified in the Sect. Camphora of Cinnamomum s.l., while the new combinations have not yet been published: 
 Cinnamomum kanehirae
 Cinnamomum longipetiolatum
 Cinnamomum saxatile

Its relationship with closely related taxa is shown below:

References

Lauraceae genera